Gross metropolitan product (GMP) is a monetary measure of the value of all final goods and services produced within a metropolitan statistical area during a specified period (e.g., a quarter, a year). GMP estimates are commonly used to compare the relative economic performance among such areas.

European Union
GMP is calculated annually by the Eurostat.

United States
GMP is calculated annually by the Bureau of Economic Analysis within the United States Department of Commerce. This is done only for metropolitan areas and not for micropolitan areas, metropolitan divisions, combined statistical areas, and BEA economic areas.

See also
 Gross regional domestic product
 Gross regional product
 List of cities by GDP
 List of EU metropolitan areas by GDP
 List of European Union regions by GDP
 List of NUTS regions in the European Union by GDP
 List of U.S. metropolitan areas by GDP
 List of U.S. metropolitan areas by GDP per capita

References

External links
 Eurostat – Statistics Explained: GDP at regional level (European regions at NUTS 2 level)

Lists by economic indicators
Metropolitan areas
Gross domestic product
United States Department of Commerce
Regional economics
Urban economics